Dmitry Filippov (August 1, 1944; Yurga, Kemerovo region, RSFSR, Soviet Union – October 13, 1998 St. Petersburg, Russia ) was a Russian-Soviet statesman, political and public figure, industrialist. Since 1974 a secretary of the Komsomol Central Committee, a member of the Council of Ministers USSR, chief of staff of the construction of Baikal-Amur Railway, chief of staff to develop the West Siberian oil and gas industry. Since 1978 a member of the Presidium of the AUCCTU, with 1986 to 1990 the secretary - supervisor of the industry of Leningrad and Leningrad region of the Leningrad Regional Committee of the Communist Party, from 1990 to 1993 the head of the State Tax Inspection in St. Petersburg, from 1993 the head of some big and reputable financial and industrial groups and public organizations in Russia.

Biography

Soviet period

Early years 

Born in Yurga, Kemerovo Region, RSFSR, Soviet Union. He graduated from Leningrad Electrotechnical Institute in 1967. After the graduation he worked as a foreman, a technologist, a head of section at "POSITRON".

Komsomol leader 

1973–1974 - a secretary of the Leningrad Regional Committee of Komsomol, 
then - the first secretary of the Leningrad Regional Committee of Komsomol.

1974–1983 - a secretary of the Komsomol Central Committee, a member of the Council of Ministers USSR, chief of staff of construction of Baikal-Amur Railway, chief of staff to develop the West Siberian oil and gas industry.

1975–1983 - the Vice-President of the Soviet-Hungarian friendship society.

from 1978  - also a member of the Presidium of the AUCCTU.

Leningrad Communist Party leader 

1983–1985 - the first secretary of the District Committee Smolninsky of the Communist Party in Leningrad. He was appointed to this position by the direct order of Andropov, Yuri Vladimirovich.

1985–1986 - the head of the light and food industry`s department of the Leningrad Regional Committee of the Communist Party.

1986–1990 - the secretary - supervisor of the industry of Leningrad and Leningrad region) of the Leningrad Regional Committee of the Communist Party.

1984–1990 - a member of City Council of People's Deputies of Leningrad.

Post-Soviet period

Russian State Tax Inspection 

1990–1993 - the head of the Russian State Tax Inspection in Saint-Petersburg.

1990–1993 - a member of City Council of People's Deputies of Saint-Petersburg.

12 October 1992, Dmitry Filippov issued an order to establish in the Russian State Tax Inspection in Saint-Petersburg tax administration investigations` department to solve the problems of prevention, detection and suppression of violations of tax laws and regulations, as well as to provide the safety of the inspection and its employees (and then converted to Federal Tax Police Service of the Russian Federation in St. Petersburg). This date became the official birthday of Saint-Petersburg Tax Police (the first Tax Police created in Russia).

In October 1993, dismissed by order of the head of the Russian State Tax Inspection. The court fully reinstated him in the position and then he dismissed at the own will.

Entrepreneur and public figure 

From 1993 - the head of a number of large financial and industrial groups and public organizations in Saint-Petersburg and Russia, including the President of the Petersburg Fuel Company (PTC), Chairman of the Board of Directors of the Bank "MENATEP SPb", a member of the Board of Directors Kirov Plant, Chairman of the Board of Directors "Rosco Financial Group", Chairman of the Board of Directors of the Tobolsk Petrochemical Plant, Chairman of the Bankers and Industrialists Council of Saint-Petersburg and others.

October 10, 1998 blown up in his apartment building.

October 13, 1998 died in the hospital.

In 2006, the court recognized the St. Petersburg deputy Yuri Shutov as the organizer of the murder. He was sentenced to life imprisonment and died in prison in 2014.

References

External links 
Obituary of Dmitry Filippov on the official website of the Legislative Assembly of Saint-Petersburg

1944 births
1998 deaths
Russian politicians
Assassinated Russian politicians
20th-century Russian businesspeople
Russian bankers
Burials at Nikolskoe Cemetery